Miguel Martorell (24 November 1937 – 14 August 2021) was a Spanish cyclist. He competed in the team pursuit at the 1960 Summer Olympics.

References

External links
 

1937 births
2021 deaths
Spanish male cyclists
Olympic cyclists of Spain
Cyclists at the 1960 Summer Olympics
Sportspeople from Mallorca
Cyclists from the Balearic Islands